Harry Cole may refer to:

Harry Cole (journalist) (born 1985), British journalist
Harold Cole (1906–1946), known as Harry, British soldier and traitor
Harry A. Cole (1921–1999), Maryland jurist
 Harry A. Cole (born 1909), American chemist, inventor of Pine-Sol

See also
Henry Cole (disambiguation)